Malakosaria is a genus of bryozoans belonging to the family Calwelliidae.

The species of this genus are found in southern South Hemisphere.

Species:

Malakosaria atlantica 
Malakosaria cecilioi 
Malakosaria dentata 
Malakosaria pholaramphos 
Malakosaria sinclairii

References

Bryozoan genera